Joana Beatriz Galeano (born 9 August 1988) is a Paraguayan footballer who plays as a midfielder for Libertad/Limpeño. She has been a member of the Paraguay women's national team. She is also a futsal player.

International career
Galeano played for Paraguay at senior level in three Copa América Femenina editions (2006, 2010 and 2018).

International goals
Scores and results list Paraguay's goal tally first

Honours

Club
Sportivo Limpeño
Copa Libertadores Femenina: 2016

References

1988 births
Living people
Women's association football midfielders
Paraguayan women's footballers
Paraguay women's international footballers
Everton de Viña del Mar footballers
Paraguayan expatriate sportspeople in Chile
Expatriate women's footballers in Chile
Paraguayan women's futsal players